Barbara Bruch (born ) is a Brazilian female volleyball player.

With her club SESI-SP she competed at the 2014 FIVB Volleyball Women's Club World Championship.

Clubs
  Osasco Vôlei (2002–2004)
  São Caetano (2004–2008)
  Osasco Vôlei (2008–2009)
  EC Pinheiros (2009–2012)
  Minas Tênis Clube (2012–2013)
  SESI-SP (2013–2014)
  Brasília Vôlei (2015–2016)
  EC Pinheiros (2016–2017)

Awards

Clubs
 2002–03 Brazilian Superliga –  Champion, with Osasco Vôlei
 2003–04 Brazilian Superliga –  Champion, with Osasco Vôlei
 2008–09 Brazilian Superliga –  Runner-up, with Osasco Vôlei
 2013–14 Brazilian Superliga –  Runner-up, with SESI-SP
 2009 South American Club Championship –  Champion, with Osasco Vôlei
 2014 South American Club Championship –  Champion, with SESI-SP
 2014 FIVB Club World Championship –  Bronze medal, with SESI-SP

References

External links
 FIVB Biography

1987 births
Living people
Brazilian women's volleyball players
Place of birth missing (living people)
People from Blumenau
Volleyball players at the 2015 Pan American Games
Pan American Games medalists in volleyball
Pan American Games silver medalists for Brazil
Middle blockers
Medalists at the 2015 Pan American Games
Sportspeople from Santa Catarina (state)